is a Japanese snowboarder. She competed in the 2018 Winter Olympics.

References

External links
 
 
 
 

 

1995 births
Living people
People from Toyama (city)
Sportspeople from Toyama Prefecture
Snowboarders at the 2018 Winter Olympics
Snowboarders at the 2012 Winter Youth Olympics
Japanese female snowboarders
Olympic snowboarders of Japan
Snowboarders at the 2017 Asian Winter Games
Youth Olympic gold medalists for Japan
21st-century Japanese women